Iamsound (stylized IAMSOUND; formerly Iamsound Records) is an American entertainment company based in Los Angeles and founded by Niki Roberton. Iamsound comprises a creative and marketing studio, visual artist management firm, and independent record label.

Record label

Iamsound launched as a record label in 2007, and released albums from artists including Florence and the Machine, Charli XCX, Lord Huron, Banks, and Salem. The label also promoted the group MS MR and released its single "Hurricane", though the group's album Secondhand Rapture eventually came out via Columbia Records. It later expanded into visual artist management and running a creative studio. In 2010, the label released a series of vinyl and digital singles called the L.A. Collection, featuring Los Angeles-based musicians through a singles club. In 2019, they signed artist Mk.gee.

Creative & marketing studio

In 2012, Iamsound collaborated with the Museum of Contemporary Art, Los Angeles for an event called PLAY MOCA, which showcased artists including Salem, IO Echo, Zola Jesus, Active Child, Cults, and Lord Huron.

They created a concert series titled "Artist Connect" with Pitchfork for American automobile brand Ford in 2014.

Iamsound's creative and marketing studio won a 2019 Clio Gold Music award for its Spotify In-House "Billie Eilish Experience" event. The company also partnered with Dropbox and Getty to present "Bridge-s" at the Getty Center Museum from November 16–17, 2019 for Solange.

Discography

Sunny Day Sets Fire – Brainless (2006)
Shakes – Sister Self Doubt (2006)
Cut Off Your Hands – Shaky Hands (2007)
The Black Ghosts – Anyway You Choose to Give It (2007)
Sunny Day Sets Fire – Summer Palace (2007)
The Black Ghosts – The Black Ghosts (2008)
Telepathe – Chrome's On It (2008)
Little Boots – Arecibo (2008)
Telepathe – Dance Mother (2008)
Fool's Gold – Fool's Gold (2009)
Suckers – Suckers (2009)
Thecocknbullkid – Querelle (2009)
Florence and the Machine – Lungs (2010)
Salem – King Night (2010)
MEN – Talk About Body (2011)
Fool's Gold – Leave No Trace (2011)
Nikki Lane – Walk of Shame (2011)
Bleeding Knees Club – Virginity (2011)
NewVillager – NewVillager (2011)
Lord Huron – Lonesome Dreams (2012)
Charli XCX – True Romance (2013)
Io Echo – Ministry of Love (2013)
Lord Huron – Strange Trails (2015)
T.O.L.D. – It's Not About the Witches (2016)
Purple – Bodacious (2016)
 Mk.gee – A Museum of Contradiction (2020)

References

External links

American independent record labels
Record labels established in 2007
Indie rock record labels
Indie pop record labels
Record labels based in California
Companies based in Los Angeles